The A921 road is a road that connects Kirkcaldy with the M90 motorway in Fife, Scotland. Before 1990, the road was classed as the A92.

References

Roads in Scotland
Transport in Fife